Gulang County is a county in central Gansu province, the People's Republic of China, bordering Inner Mongolia to the northeast. It is under the administration of Wuwei City. Its postal code is 733100, and its population in 2006 was 393,200 people. Located in the east of the Hexi Corridor and to the south of the Tengger Desert, it borders Jingtai County to the east, Tianzhu County to the south, Liangzhou District to the northwest, and Inner Mongolia's Alxa Left Banner to the northeast.

Geography

Climate

History
Evidence has been found of Gulang being inhabited 4000 years ago, during the Neolithic.

Administrative divisions
Gulang County is divided to 15 towns and 4 townships.
Towns

Townships

Economy
The main economy is agriculture, with 365600 people being employed in agriculture (92.98% of total population).

Transport 
China National Highway 312

Ethnic groups
Among the groups that live in Gulang are the Han and Hui.

See also
 List of administrative divisions of Gansu

References

External links
  Official website (Chinese)
https://web.archive.org/web/20090504073433/http://www.gu-lang.com/ Lhasa Apsos Kennel Barcelona Spain - Tibet Apsos

Gulang County
Wuwei, Gansu